JoJoHead is a 2016 American comedy web series written and created by Johanna Stein, which debuted on October 14, 2016, on The CW's online streaming platform, CW Seed. It stars creator Johanna Stein as JoJo and features numerous guest stars over 18 episodes. The series is directed by Stein's producing partner, Suzanne Luna.

Cast

Series regulars 
 Johanna Stein as JoJo

Guest stars 
 James Grace
 Timothy A. Bennett
 Brian Blondell
 Alison Martin
 Claire Proctor
 Christine Mini Chang
 Lori Collins
 Ali Elk
 Nicole Ettinger
 David Gassman
 Joy Gohring
 Brian Konowal
 Jerry Lambert
 Ellison Hinnen
 Fisher Hinnen
 Kate James
 Beth Littleford
 Brian Majestic
 Caisha Williams
 Brian Jordan Alvarez
 David Bock
 Tyler Booth
 Tom Choi
 Annie Chow
 Olivia Chow
 Michael Coleman
 Darius Delacruz
 J Ferguson
 Thomas Fowler
 Peter A. Hulne
 Carol Locatell
 Jane Morris
 Lori Nasso
 Apul Patel
 Tony Rodriguez
 Joe Shamel
 John Spezzano
 Michael Terrence
 Tracy Vilar
 Katherine Wallace
 Juzo Yoshida

Production and release 
JoJoHead was produced by Warner Bros.' Blue Ribbon Content digital studio and the all-female production company Unperfect Productions in 2016. The show features comedic vignettes about the life of an everyday woman and is a prequel to the creator's viral YouTube video Momhead in 2014 which received 2.7 million views. Both series were filmed from a bird's eye view using a GoPro camera on top of Stein's head. Johanna Stein likened the lead character JoJo, based on her life, to a female Mr. Bean.

The series was released on CW Seed, The CW's streaming platform, in 2016. It was also promoted through weekly Instagram Stories on the CW Seed's Instagram account.

References

External links 
 JoJoHead on CW Seed
 

2010s American comedy television series
2016 American television series debuts
2016 web series debuts
American comedy web series
The CW original programming
Television series by Blue Ribbon Content